Emanuel Ford (fl. 1607) was an Elizabethan romancer.  He was the author of Parismus, in two parts (1598–99), long exceedingly popular, and of the similar romances, Ornatus and Artesia (1607) and Montelion (1633, but probably published earlier).

  
 

Year of birth missing
Year of death missing
16th-century English writers
16th-century male writers
17th-century English writers
17th-century English male writers